Port of Bristol Football Club (aka Port of Bristol FC) is a football club formed in 1978, based in Shirehampton, Bristol, England. They compete in the Bristol and Suburban Association Football League. The club is run by the Port of Bristol trust and fields teams from juniors to seniors.

Their kit is purple and black, and their away strip is red and black.

History 
The club played in the Gloucestershire County Football League and won promotion from Division 9 twice (1982 and 1985), but by the end of the 1993-94 financial woes hit the club, and they merged with neighbors Totterdown Athletic to form Tottertown Port of Bristol FC. The merger then folded at the conclusion of the 2006–07 season after producing only one top half of the table finish in its existence.
 
Port of Bristol Football Club was re-founded in 2014 with junior teams being fielded for the first time in 7 years. Senior football returned and in the 2019–2020 season and entered the Len Bartlett Cup, making it all the way to the semi finals.

The following season they won Division 6 Bristol Suburban league and won promotion.

Ground 
Port of Bristol FC are based at The PBA Community and Sports hub on the banks of the River Avon, in Shirehampton village, Bristol.

Rivalries 
Port of Bristol's nearest rivals are Bristol Manor Farm FC and Shirehampton F.C.

Records and statistics
 Record League Victory 
13-0 v. Warmley Rangers F.C. (1984)
 Record FA Vase Victory
5-0 v. Abingdon Town (1979-1980)
 Record League Defeat
0-7 v. Stoke Lane AFC (1982)
 Record FA Vase Defeat
0-5 v. Exmouth Town F.C. (1984–85)

Honours
League
Gloucestershire County League (11th tier)
 Runners-up: (2) 1982–83, 1984-1985

Bristol and Suburban Association Football League
 Division 6 (17th tier) Champions 2020-2021
 Division 9 Sunday League Champions: (2) 1985, 1990
 Division 10 Sunday League Champions: (2) 1982, 1987

Domestic Cups
FA Vase 
 3rd Round 1980-81

Len Bartlett Cup 
 Semi Finalist 2020

References

External links
 Port of Bristol FC on Twitter
 Port of Bristol YFC
 Bristol and Suburban Association Football League
 Bristol and Suburban Association Football League at The FA
 Port of Bristol FC at Pitchfinder

Football clubs in England
Football clubs in Bristol
Association football clubs established in 1978
1978 establishments in England